Stephen Richards (born 24 October 1961 in Dundee) is a Scottish former professional footballer.

In August 1998 he succeeded Ernie Moss as manager of Gainsborough Trinity. He, along with his assistant Paul Olsson, resigned from the post on 7 October 1999 following the fall out from Trinity's FA Cup Third Qualifying Round Replay 2–1 defeat at home to Droylsden two days previously which saw Trinity players Mick Norbury and Neil Lacey sent-off: Lacey for a late tackle which caused the Droyslden bench to invade the pitch and Norbury after the final whistle.

In October 2000 he was appointed manager at Frickley Athletic with the club struggling at the foot of the Northern Premier League Premier Division with just six points from 14 league games. He subsequently guided the club to the First Round proper of the FA Cup as well as ensuring the club avoided relegation with a last day victory at Lancaster City giving the club 45 points from 44 matches.

In September 2001, following a run of eight games without a win, he resigned his post at Frickley Athletic, but wasted no time in finding a new club as he succeeded Peter Daniel as manager of Goole.

In October 2003 he was appointed manager at Ossett Town with the club rock bottom of the Northern Premier League Division One with just three points from 13 games but Richards managed to steer them to fourteenth place by the end of the season.

References

External links
 

1961 births
Living people
Footballers from Dundee
Scottish footballers
Hull City A.F.C. players
Grantham Town F.C. players
Goole Town F.C. players
Gainsborough Trinity F.C. players
York City F.C. players
Lincoln City F.C. players
Cambridge United F.C. players
Scarborough F.C. players
Halifax Town A.F.C. players
Doncaster Rovers F.C. players
Guiseley A.F.C. players
English Football League players
Gainsborough Trinity F.C. managers
Ossett Town F.C. managers
Goole A.F.C. managers
Frickley Athletic F.C. managers
Guiseley A.F.C. managers
Association football defenders
Scottish football managers